Louis Martin (1866 — 1957) was a French financier and senior civil servant.

He was a polytechnician from 1885-1886. He worked as Inspector General of Finance, Deputy Governor of the Crédit Foncier de France and Managing Director, and finally Governor of the Crédit National from 1919 to 1936.

References

Bibliography 
 Robert Bœuf, The National Credit, Paris, University Press of France, 1923

1866 births
1957 deaths
Inspection générale des finances (France)
French bankers